Tara Flanagan (born in October 18, 1963, San Francisco) is a Judge of the Superior Court of the State of California in the County of Alameda, and former rugby union player. She was a member of the victorious  1991 Women's Rugby World Cup squad and also played in the following World Cup in 1994.

Life 
Flanagan earned a Bachelor of Science degree from California State University, Northridge. She lived in England while in pursuit of her rugby dreams. She enrolled at the Southwestern Law School after the 1994 World Cup and received her Juris Doctor degree in 1998.

References

External links 
Eagles Profile

Living people
United States women's international rugby union players
American female rugby union players
1964 births
21st-century American women